The Institute of Business Studies & Research (IBSAR) is a business school located in the CBD Belapur district of Navi Mumbai and also at Baner Pune, India. IBSAR was established in 2005 in Mumbai and 2007 in Pune. It focuses on business programs for specific disciplines and places emphasis on training for the business world.  The executive director of the Institute is Dr. M. L. Monga. ISBAR is also ISO 9001:2000 certified for quality management systems.

IBSAR Has its own college building & hostel. IBSAR has applied for AICTE approval.

Programs
IBSAR Programme Architecture 
Master of International Business 
MBA in Marketing, Retail & Information System Management 
MBA in Human Resource & Information System Management 
MBA in Financial Services & Information System Management 
MBA in Logistics & Supply Chain Management 
Bachelor of Business Administration (BBA) 
MA (Human Resources) 
Master of Journalism (Print and Mass communication) 
Bachelor of Journalism (English Print Media)
Post Graduate Program In Business Management

External links
 Institute of Business Studies & Research (Official Website)

Education in Navi Mumbai
Business schools in Mumbai
Educational institutions established in 2005
2005 establishments in Maharashtra